The Female Response (known in the UK as Everybody’s at it) is a 1973 American sexploitation film directed by Tim Kincaid.

Plot 

Feminist newspaper columnist Marjorie is fired by her boss for refusing to curb the libertarian content of her writing. Instead, she gathers with six other women to discuss their sexual history as material for future writing to get the real female response. Her subjects are high-class prostitute Victoria, hippie Sandy, frustrated housewife Leona, overweight secretary Rosalie, dental nurse Gilda and socialite Andrea. They discuss their various sexual thoughts and agree to meet again in a month. When they reconvene Andrea's habit of leading men on and shunning them has resulted in her being raped by a mechanic, though she confesses she enjoyed it; Leona has attempted to rekindle her physical relationship with her husband with disappointing results; Victoria has begun a serious love affair with one of her clients; Sandy enjoys a liaison with a motorist while hitchhiking; Gilda has given in to her fascination with classified adverts in Screw but ends up in a bizarre BDSM session and Rosalie loses her virginity at a swinger's party.

Their sessions are intercut with vox-pop interviews on the street, where Marjorie questions passers-by.

Cast
Raina Barrett as Leona
Jacque Lynn Colton as Rosalie
Michaela Hope as Sandy
Jennifer Welles as Andrea
Gena Wheeler as Victoria
Marjorie Hirsch as Marjorie
Roz Kelly as Gilda
Lawrason Driscoll as Karl
Edmund Donnelly as Mark
Todd Everett as Gary
Richard Wilkins as Tom
Phyllis MacBride as Rachel
Suzy Mann as Ramona
Curtis Carlson as Alex
Herb Streicher as Max
Anthony Scott Craig as Caller
Richard Lipton as Leland

Response
Rob Craig described the individual tales of the characters as "vacillating from mind-numbingly boring to downright surreal" and their journey to sexual fulfilment as "pat and incredible" but noted the "cutting edge" editing techniques used by director Kincaid.

References

External links

1973 films
1970s English-language films
1970s American films
American sexploitation films